Tytthoscincus biparietalis is a species of skink. It is endemic to the Philippines. It has been called the Sulu sphenomorphus as it was originally placed in the genus Sphenomorphus and the type locality is the Sulu Archipelago.

References

biparietalis
Endemic fauna of the Philippines
Reptiles of the Philippines
Reptiles described in 1918
Taxa named by Edward Harrison Taylor